Clint Kofi Sintim (born February 21, 1986) is the linebackers coach for the University of Virginia football team and a former American football linebacker who played in the National Football League. He was drafted by the New York Giants in the second round of the 2009 NFL Draft. He played college football at Virginia.

Early years
A native of Fairfax County, Virginia, Sintim attended Gar-Field Senior High School, where he made 35 tackles and had three quarterback sacks as a senior and earned first-team all-state and SuperPrep All-American honors. Sintim broke his left leg playing for Gar-Field's boys basketball team on January 13. He is of Ghanaian descent.

Considered a three-star recruit by Rivals.com, Sintim was listed as the No. 30 strongside defensive end prospect in the nation. He picked Virginia over Tennessee and Virginia Tech on February 2, 2004.

College career
Sintim lined up as rush linebacker in Virginia's 3-4 defense. He led the NCAA in sacks by a linebacker his senior year. He ranked third on the team with 70 tackles (38 solos) and had eleven sacks and thirteen stops for losses in 2008. Additionally, he caused a fumble and recovered two others and deflected three passes

In 2007, he started all 13 games and had 78 tackles, with 44 being solo and nine going for a loss. He also had nine sacks and forced three fumbles and was second on the team behind Chris Long with 17 quarterback pressures. The previous season, 2006, he started all twelve games and had 45 tackles (22 solo) with 10 of them going for a loss. He also had four sacks and forced a fumble and recovered one and had five quarterback pressures.

Professional career

2009 NFL Draft

New York Giants
Sintim was drafted in the second round of the 2009 NFL Draft by the New York Giants on April 25, 2009. On July 30, the Giants announced that they had signed Sintim to the roster. Eventually, he was expected to replace the Danny Clark/Bryan Kehl linebacker position. Sintim made his debut on October 11, 2009 against the Oakland Raiders in Giants Stadium. He recorded 4 tackles in the game. Three were solo and one assist. Sintim ended his rookie season with a total of 20 Tackles (14 Solo, 6 Assisted) 1.0 sack and 1 tackle for a loss in 11 games. In 2010, he recorded a total of 13 tackles (7 Solo, 6 Assisted) and appeared in 13 games. Sintim tore his ACL twice and never played in 2011. In 2012, he entered training camp on the physically unable to perform list and was eventually waived on August 16, 2012 after failing a team physical. On May 6, 2013, he announced his retirement.

References

External links
 Delaware football bio
 Virginia football bio 

1986 births
Living people
American football linebackers
American people of Ghanaian descent
Delaware Fightin' Blue Hens football coaches
New York Giants players
People from Woodbridge, Virginia
Players of American football from Virginia
Richmond Spiders football coaches
Sportspeople from Fairfax County, Virginia
Virginia Cavaliers football coaches
Virginia Cavaliers football players
West Alabama Tigers football coaches